Dias Kamelov (born 29 May 1981) is a Kazakhstani football midfielder. He plays for the club FC Zhetysu and capped for Kazakhstan national football team 7 times, including two qualifying matches for the 2006 FIFA World Cup.

References

External links

1981 births
Living people
Kazakhstani footballers
Association football midfielders
Kazakhstan international footballers
FC Zhenis Astana players
FC Taraz players
FC Atyrau players
FC Irtysh Pavlodar players
FC Tobol players
FC Ordabasy players